The Divje Babe flute, also called tidldibab, is a cave bear femur pierced by spaced holes that was unearthed in 1995 during systematic archaeological excavations led by the Institute of Archaeology of the Research Centre of the Slovenian Academy of Sciences and Arts, at the Divje Babe I near Cerkno in northwestern Slovenia. It has been suggested that it was made by Neanderthals as a form of musical instrument, and became known as the Neanderthal flute. The artifact is on prominent public display in the National Museum of Slovenia in Ljubljana as a Neanderthal flute. As such, it would be the world's oldest known musical instrument. Like many other Middle Paleolithic (Mousterian) finds that might reflect symbolic behavior and advanced cognitive abilities among Neanderthals, this find was met with severe criticism and rejection by a part of the scientific community. Finds of symbolic significance are of primary interest within Paleolithic research. Special attention is devoted to the discoveries that predate the arrival of anatomically modern humans in Europe about 40,000 years ago.

Site and similar findings in Slovenia

Researchers working at the site have uncovered more than 600 archaeological items in at least ten levels, including twenty hearths and the skeletal remains of cave bears. According to the museum's statements, the flute has been associated with the "end of the middle Pleistocene" and with Neanderthals, about 55,000 years ago.

In the 1920s and 1930s, professor Srečko Brodar (father of Mitja Brodar) discovered tens of bones with holes at another site in the Eastern Karawanks, but almost all of them were destroyed in an Allied air raid during World War II in Celje, where they were stored. Of those still preserved, the best known is a mandible of a cave bear with three holes in the mandibular canal.

Since World War II, some other perforated bones have been found. These bones are preserved today at the National History Museum of Slovenia as well. According to Mitja Brodar, who discovered many of them, bones with holes have been dated only to the end of the Mousterian and the beginning of the Aurignacian. Bones with holes such as those found in the Potočka zijalka cave have been ascribed to modern human Cro-Magnon, and Mitja Brodar asserted that they are an element of the Central European Aurignacian. He further posited that the Divje Babe Flute is a product of modern humans.

Neanderthal flute 

Unlike Upper Palaeolithic flutes, the total original length of the Divje Babe Neanderthal musical instrument has been preserved allowing its reliable reconstruction. Considering the preserved total length, the number of holes, and the existence of partially preserved blowing edge on proximal end, simple and reliable reconstruction of the find as a musical instrument was made. The reconstruction is based on the finding that the femur was first an artefact from which a carnivore had subsequently (when the object was lost or discarded) gnawed off now missing parts. The Neanderthal musical instrument from Divje babe I meets all the requirements to be called the oldest known musical instrument. These are: clear archaeological and stratigraphic context, dating, explanation of manufacture, musical verification, and good comparisons in later periods. This find is currently the strongest material evidence of Neanderthal musical behaviour. It is at least 10,000 years older than the earliest Aurignacian wind instruments discovered in the German caves Hohle Fels, Geißenklösterle and Vogelherd. The Neanderthal musical instrument is on display at the National Museum of Slovenia in Ljubljana.

Description of the Neanderthal flute

The bone of which Neanderthal flute is made, is a 11.4 cm long left diaphysis of femur that belonged to a one to two year old cave bear cub. On the posterior side, there are two complete holes (Holes 2 and 3 of the flute) in the central diaphysis. Notch 1 (Hole 1 of the flute) is located near the proximal end. The larger, semicircular notch (Notch 4 of the flute) is located at the distal end. On the anterior side, another semicircular notch 5 (Hole 5 of the flute) is located near at the distal end. This notch is equivalently positioned longitudinally as is Hole 3 on the posterior side. Holes 2 and 3 are approximately the same size. Notches 1 and 5 are both the same size, but smaller than Holes 2 and 3. All the holes and notches are arranged in a line and have a similar morphology, except for the larger notch 4. Proximally and distally to Hole 3, a portion of the cortical bone is abraded. On this spot, a longitudinal fibrous bone structure is exposed. Near the proximal edge of Hole 3, there are two parallel micro-scores on the abraded surface of the cortical bone, corresponding to the cut marks of stone tools. Abraded cortical bone and two parallel micro-scores indicate artificial modification of the cortical bone before Hole 3 was made. By thinning the cortical bone where it is the thickest, Neanderthals facilitated perforation of the femur. Inside the medullary cavity from which the spongy bone was removed, the cortical bone is broken off at the edge of Hole 1, 2, 3, and 5. A funnel-shaped fracture of the inner edge of these holes is a typical damage occurring during piercing the cortical bone. The presence of this fracture proves that there were originally 4 holes on the femur. Notch 4 cannot be said to have the same origin as the other holes and notches because Notch 4 does not have a funnel-shaped fracture inside the medullary cavity. On the posterior side of the bone, a V-shaped fracture is present on the proximal end, reaching the nearest Notch 1. A similar fracture is present on the anterior side of the distal end, reaching Notch 5. The V-fracture is a typical carnivore damage that occurred after the flute was no longer in use. On the proximal end, part of the straight sharp edge bevelled on both sides (the mouthpiece of the flute) is preserved, which is abruptly interrupted by a V-shaped fracture on the anterior side.

Context and dating of the Neanderthal flute

The Neanderthal flute was found in the Mousterian level, which contained lithic artefacts and hearths. The flute was cemented into the phosphate breccia in close proximity to the hearth. Between the Mousterian level containing the flute and the Aurignacian level containing stone artefacts and osseous points of anatomically modern humans, lay about 2 m of sediment. Based on the average AMS-14C age of the charcoal found in the hearth, the age of the flute was initially estimated at 43,100 ± 700 years BP. Later dating using the more powerful ESR method has shown that the layer containing the flute is outside the dating range of the AMS-14C method and that the original dating of samples from this layer was incorrect. According to ESR dating, the age of the flute is now estimated at 50,000 to 60,000 years BP.

Origin of the holes: human or carnivore?

Since the discovery, the key question has been whether the holes were made by a human or a carnivore, that is, whether the object is an artefact or simply naturally altered bone. Upper Palaeolithic flutes made from the limb bones of mammals show clear traces of artificial creation of holes which were carved or drilled with stone tools. In flutes made from thin, delicate bird bones, the holes were made by grinding the bone cortex. The edge of the holes on the Neanderthal flute differs from those on Upper Palaeolithic flutes and shows no conventional signs of human manufacture (i.e., cut marks). In addition, both ends of the Neanderthal flute show damage typical of gnawing by carnivores. The excavation leader Ivan Turk suggested two possible explanations shortly after the discovery: An artefact or a gnawed bone pierced with teeth. According to the first explanation, this find would be the oldest musical instrument indisputably attributed to Neanderthals. The explanation that the find is a bone gnawed and pierced by a carnivore has been unhesitatingly accepted by some scientists. Their investigations of the find were distinctively one-sided and, with a one exception, contained no experiments. A critical review of their reasoning was presented by Ivan Turk et al. To clarify the origin of the holes, Ivan Turk and his colleagues experimentally investigated whether the holes might have been made by carnivores or human.

Experimental testing of the carnivore origin of the holes

Besides prevailing cave bears, rare large carnivores could hypothetically have made holes in the bones at Divje babe I. These are brown bear, cave lion, leopard and wolf, which together comprise less than 0.1% of all large mammal remains excavated at Divje babe I. No cave hyena skeletal remains, digested bones, or coprolites were found to prove its presence at this site. To test the hypothesis that carnivores caused the holes in the bone, metal dental casts of cave bear, wolf and hyena (which was the main cause of damage to the bones in the caves where it was present) dentition were made. The casts were used to pierce juvenile and adult fresh brown bear femurs. Experimental piercing showed that the two complete holes are comparable in shape and size only to those caused by the canine teeth of a bear. As for the bear bite, however, their orientation is problematic. Namely, the canines of bears have an oval cross-section in the labial-lingual direction. Since the two complete holes in the Neanderthal flute are slightly oval in the direction of the longitudinal axis of the femur, the bear would have to align the bone in its snout longitudinally with its jaw when biting into it. It would have to do this for every hole individually which is highly unlikely. Furthermore, holes pierced with canine teeth have smooth edge, whereas the edge of the holes on the Neanderthal flute is irregular and serrated. The results of experimental piercing have revealed that holes on the flute could not have been produced by a carnivore. It is practically impossible for a carnivore to make two or more holes on the thickest and the rigid central part of the juvenile femur without breaking it. Moreover, it is very difficult for a carnivore that would bite the bone with canine teeth to get all the holes in a straight line in several successive bites, especially when the bone is fresh and greasy.

Experimental testing of the artificial origin of the holes

Pointed stone tools appropriate for piercing bone were found in several Mousterian levels at Divje babe I. There are broken tips, fractures and macroscopic damage presented on some pointed stone tools. It was proved experimentally that the same type of damage occurs if one hits the stone tool with a wooden hammer when chiselling and piercing the bone. In addition, several ad hoc bone punches  were found in Mousterian levels.
The answer to the question of how Neanderthals could make comparable holes in bones was provided by experimental archaeology. The first step in this direction was made by the experimental archaeologist Giuliano Bastiani. Using replicas of pointed stone tools, Bastiani pierced the bone in a way previously unknown to archaeologists. He used the pointed stone tool simultaneously as a chisel and a punch, and succeeded in making holes in the fresh femur similar to those on the flute (i.e., holes with irregular, serrated edge). The most important conclusion of his experiment was that the edge of the holes made in this way did not always show the characteristic cut marks left by a stone tool. However, the holes made by Bastiani did not have such pronounced funnel-shaped fractures around the inner edge, as found on the holes of the flute. The holes, which in this respect also correspond to those of the flute, were made by the archaeologist Francois Zoltán Horusitzky. Using a pointed stone tool, Horusitzky first made a shallow pit in a fresh bone without piercing it. He then inserted a bone punch into the pit and struck it with a wooden hammer to pierce the bone cortex, creating a hole that exactly matched that of the flute. The holes made with this technique have a pronounced funnel-shaped fracture around the inner edge and show no conventional tool marks.

Computed-tomography analysis

Computed micro-tomography confirmed that there are scores on the surface of the Neanderthal flute that could have been made by stone tools. Some of the damage on the bone, interpreted by some scientists as teeth marks, turned out to be the result of chemical weathering. It was confirmed that a crack on the posterior side of the femur, which zigzags longitudinally from one end to another is superficial and thus not related to piercing. Such cracks often occur on limb bones during fossilization. Given its course, the crack on the flute is significantly different from continuous, rectilinear in-depth cracks that occurred during experimental piercing when compressing fresh young bear femurs with metal casts of carnivore dentition.

Criticism and rejection after the excavation

Whether the artifact is actually a flute created by Neanderthals was a subject of a long debate. A critical issue at the time of excavation was uncertainty about if the holes in the flute are of artificial origin. Slovenian archeologist Mitja Brodar argued in 2008 that the flute was made by Cro-Magnons as an element of Central European Aurignacian culture. Others suggest it was altered by animals. Claus-Stephan Holdermann, Jordi Serangeli, Philip G. Chase, April Nowell, and French-based Italian taphonomist Francesco D'Errico have all supported a carnivore origin.

Hole-spacing, alignment and shape

The probability that four randomly placed holes would appear in line in a recognizable musical scale is very low according to a 2000 analysis made by Canadian musicologist Bob Fink. Responding to the D'Errico carnivore-origin hypothesis, Turk pointed out that the features "common" between the carnivore-origin artifact and other chewed bones studied by D'Errico (see Hole shape below) do not include the alignment of the holes.

There is also no evidence that the two holes could have been bitten at the same time. The tooth spans were analyzed by all taphonomists concerned to see if any animals could bite two or more such holes at once. No match could be found to any known animals. If a match had been found, it could have been cited as prima facie evidence that the holes were animal-made. This was noted by Turk in his book and was also noted from the opposing hypothesis holders Nowell and Chase in their article in the August/October 1998 issue of Current Anthropology. Nowell wrote that holes in the specimen "were almost certainly made sequentially rather than simultaneously and that the distance between them has nothing to do with the distance between any two teeth in a wolf's jaw."

Iain Morley, despite his holding the carnivore-origin hypothesis, observed in his November 2006 article that, "[w]hilst the collections of cave bear bones examined by D'Errico...as well as those discussed by Turk...do show similar shaped and damaged holes...none of these occur in the diaphysis of a femur," as is found on the reputed flute.

Marcel Otte (director of the Museum of Prehistory, University of Liege, Belgium) pointed out in an April 2000 article in Current Anthropology that there is a possible thumb-hole on the opposite side of the Divje Babe bone, which, making five holes, would perfectly fit a human hand.

Turk wrote in the MIT Press book The Origins of Music: "If this probability [of having lined-up holes looking like a flute] were greater (and of course it isn't), it is likely that there would have been more such finds, since...carnivores in cave dens were at least as active on bones, if not more so, than people in cave dwellings...".

In 2015 Cajus G. Diedrich suggested the holes could be explained by scavenging from spotted hyena.

D'Errico made an analysis of the artifact in comparison to cave-bear bone accumulations where no hominid presence was known. They published photos of several bones with holes in them which had more or less circular holes similar to those found in the artifact, but they did not have a single bone coming even close to the linear alignment of Turk's holes. Ignoring the probability of the alignment of the holes, D'Errico's interpretation was that it was possible for the holes to have been made by an animal, and they concluded that of the available options this was the most likely. D'Errico insisted on ignoring the probability of the alignment of the holes and, even after having analyzed the artifact firsthand, claimed that "the presence of two or possibly three perforations on the suggested flute cannot therefore be considered as evidence of human manufacture, as this is a common feature in the studied sample."

Turk conducted laboratory experiments which pierced holes in fresh bear bones in the manner of carnivore punctures, and in every case, the bones split. Yet in the Divje Babe instance, the bone did not break, a fact not matching expectations of carnivore action, as Turk's results showed. Turk wrote, in his book and in his article in MIT's Origins of Music anthology, the bone shows no "counter-bites" that one would normally expect on the other side of the bone matching the immense pressure necessary for a bite to make the center holes.

Turk's 1997 book reported that the holes have similar diameters which would accommodate fingertips, and all are circular instead of oval (as carnivore bites often are). Furthermore, all are in the proper ratio of bore size to hole size found in most flutes, and the bone is the kind (femur) usually used for bone flutes.

An examination of the specimen using computed tomography was published in 2005 by Ivan Turk, in which he concluded that "the two partially preserved holes were formerly created before the damage...or before the indisputable intervention of a carnivore."

The National Museum of Slovenia argues that this evidence has "finally refuted hypotheses that the bone was perforated because of a bear bite". The manufacture by Neanderthals "is reliably proven" and its significance in the understanding of their capabilities and the development of music and speech is secure.

Bone marrow 
The issue of how much bone marrow remains in the artifact is important, because the making of flutes from bone usually includes removing the marrow.

Turk et al. (in the volume Mousterian Bone Flute, p. 160) wrote that "the marrow cavity is basically cleaned of spongiose. The colour of the marrow cavity does not differ from the colour of the external surface of the bone. So we may conclude that the marrow cavity was already open at the time.... Otherwise, it would be a darker colour than the surface of the bone, as we know from coloured marrow cavities of whole limb bones."

April Nowell stated in an interview that "at Turk's invitation, [Nowell] and Chase went to Slovenia last year... They came away even more skeptical that the bear bone had ever emitted music. For one thing, both ends had clearly been gnawed away by something, perhaps a wolf, seeking greasy marrow. The holes could have simply been perforated in the process by pointed canine or carnassial teeth, and their roundness could be due to natural damage after the bone was abandoned. The presence of marrow suggests that no one had bothered to hollow out the bone as if to create an end-blown flute. Says Nowell, '[Turk's] willing to give it the benefit of the doubt, whereas we're not.' "

Diatonic scale

Bob Fink claimed in his essay in 1997, that the bone's holes were "consistent with four notes of the diatonic scale" (do, re, mi, fa) based on the spacing of those four holes. The spacing of the holes on a modern diatonic (minor scale) flute are unique, and not evenly spaced. In essence, Fink said, they are like a simple fingerprint. The Divje Babe bone's holes matched those spacings very closely to a series of note-holes in a minor scale.

Nowell and Chase wrote in Studies In Music Archaeology III that the juvenile bear bone was too short to play those four holes in tune to any diatonic series of tones and half-tones. (Fink had suggested there may have originally been a mouthpiece extension added to the bone before it was broken.)

In a 2011 article, Matija Turk published the results of a collaboration with Ljuben Dimkaroski, an academic musician who had made replicas of the artifact. The authors argue that the instrument encompassed a range of two and a half octaves, which can be extended to three octaves by overblowing. Dimkaroski created over 100 wooden and bone replicas of the flute and experimented with them. The replicas were made from femurs of juvenile brown bears provided by the Hunters Association of Slovenia, but also calf, goat, pig, roe and red deer bones. In the end, he concentrated on playing a replica made on a femur of a juvenile cave bear from Divje Babe I Cave, to come as close as possible to the dimensions of the original.

Musical verification 

An additional argument for the thesis that the pierced femur from Divje babe I is an intentionally made musical instrument comes from experimental musical research on a reconstructed instrument. In its preserved state, the find is not suitable for playing music as are none of the other discovered Upper Palaeolithic wind instruments, traditionally called flutes or pipes. The Neanderthal flute has been studied by several musical researchers. In 2014, professional musician Ljuben Dimkaroski studied the flute experimentally, independently of previous research. Dimkaroski, who played on a reconstructed replica, oriented the instrument differently than the others and used the proximal part of the femur as a mouthpiece. On the anterior proximal part a straight cut sharpened edge is preserved, which was not considered by previous researchers. This artificially modified edge may actually be a remnant of the blowing edge of the mouthpiece. With this orientation of the instrument, the role of Hole 5, the single hole on the anterior side, was clarified. In the primary orientation, the location of this hole was too close to the mouthpiece and thus was dysfunctional. Hole 5 now became useful as a palm hole. The reconstructed instrument has three finger holes (Holes 1–3) on the posterior side and a palm hole (Hole 5) on the anterior side of the femur. An opening on the distal part is in the function of bell or closure. With a finger of the right hand, the notch on the posterior distal side may be formed into an additional hole. The opening provides the possibility of playing on an open or closed bell, which additionally enriches the tonal range. The Neanderthal flute is played two-handed with Hole 5 being used to extend the air column to twice its length. This is a solution not used by modern wind instruments and means that there is no need for doubling the length of the instrument or adding a higher number of holes. As such, the Neanderthal flute and method of playing on it have no suitable comparison in contemporary musical instruments.

The reconstructed Neanderthal flute has a capability of 3½ octaves and all contemporary music genres can be played on it. It is possible to perform a series of musical articulations and ornamentations such as legato, staccato, double and triple tonguing, flutter-tonguing, glissando, chromatic scales, trills, broken chords, interval leaps, and melodic successions from the lowest to the highest tones. Dimkaroski came to conclusion that the four holes, their size and the distance between them, together with the distal end notch and the blowing edge of the mouthpiece comprise a system that enables a wide variety of sonority and melodic movement, and that such a system could not have emerged accidentally but was intentionally created. Any change in the system, whether changing the length of the instrument, adding or removing holes or an absence of sharpened blowing edge, evokes poorer musical expression as a consequence. Francois Zoltán Horusitzky reached the same conclusions by calculating the instrument's tonality. According to Dimkaroski, the name "flute" is not appropriate for such an instrument, which could be considered a precursor of modern wind instruments. Since the instrument and the way it is played are not comparable to modern wind instruments, he named it TIDLDIBAB. The name is a composite word made up of the initials of the archaeologist who is credited with the discovery of the instrument (Turk Ivan), the musician and maker of its replicas (Dimkaroski Ljuben) and the name of its archaeological find spot (Divje Babe).

See also 
 List of Neanderthal sites
 Neanderthal
 Musilanguage
 Prehistoric music
 Musical scale
 Diatonic
 Hohle Fels
 Gudi – 6000 BC Chinese bone flute

References

Sources 

 Brodar, Mitja. 2009. Stara kamena doba v Sloveniji = Altsteinzeit in Slowenien. Ljubljana, samozalozba.
 
 
 
 
 
 
 
 Fink, Bob, 2002-3, "The Neanderthal flute and origin of the scale: fang or flint? A response," in: Ellen Hickmann, Anne Draffkorn Kilmer and Ricardo Eichmann (Eds.), Studies in Music Archaeology III, Verlag Marie Leidorf GmbH., Rahden/Westf. Germany, pp 83–87. Probability analysis.
 
 
 
 
 
 
 Turk, Ivan, Miran Pflaum, and Dean Pekarovič. 2005. "Rezultati računalniške tomografije najstarejše domnevne piščali iz Divjih bab I (Slovenija): prispevek k teoriji luknjanja kosti", "Results of Computer Tomography of the Oldest Suspected Flute from Divje Babe I (Slovenia): Contribution to the Theory of Making Holes in Bones" (English & Slovenian). Arheološki vestnik: Acta archaeologica—Ljubljana : Slovenska Akademija Znanosti in Umetnosti, Sekcija za arheologijo 56:9-36. (2005 version contains tomography slice photos & analysis)
 Turk, Matija and Dimkaroski, Ljuben. 2011. "Neandertalska piščal iz Divjih bab I: stara in nova spoznanja", "Neanderthal Flute from Divje babe I: Old and New Findings" (English & Slovenian). Opera Instituti Archaeologici Sloveniae : Založba ZRC SAZU, Ljubljana 21:251-265.
 
 Wallin, Nils, Björn Merker, and Steven Brown, eds. 2000. The Origins of Music. Proceedings of the First Florentine Workshop in Biomusicology, Fiesole, 1997. Cambridge, Mass.: MIT Press. .

Further reading

External links
 

Archaeological discoveries in Slovenia
Ancient music
Stone Age of Slovenia
Cerkno Hills
Individual musical instruments
Neanderthals
1995 archaeological discoveries
Bone carvings
Archaeological controversies